Thomas Rushby (6 September 1880 at Stoke d'Abernon, Cobham, Surrey – 13 July 1962 at Ewell, Surrey) was an English cricketer. He was a right-arm fast-medium bowler who played for Surrey from 1903 to 1921. In all first-class matches, he took 954 wickets at an average of 20.58. In his final season, he took all ten wickets for 43 runs in the Somerset first innings at Taunton.

References 
Cricinfo
Wisden obituary

English cricketers
Surrey cricketers
1880 births
1962 deaths
People from Stoke d'Abernon
Players cricketers
Cricketers who have taken ten wickets in an innings